Designed by Joseph G. Steinkamp & Brother, the Neoclassical-styled Hotel Metropole opened in 1912 in downtown Cincinnati as a 10-story hotel.  In 1924 an 11th floor penthouse apartment was added.  In 1971 the building was converted to low-income housing with retail and restaurants on the first floor.

In June 2009 the building was added to the NRHP and later that year it was announced that it would be converted into a 21c Museum Hotel with "156 guest rooms, a contemporary art museum with more than 8,000 square feet of exhibition space, a restaurant, and meeting space." The renovated hotel was later inducted into Historic Hotels of America, the official program of the National Trust for Historic Preservation, in 2019, and it remains a member in 2022.

References

External links
 Historical Photos of the Metropole

National Register of Historic Places in Cincinnati
Hotels in Ohio
Historic Hotels of America